Shadow Lake is a census-designated place (CDP) in King County, Washington, United States. The population was 2,262 at the 2010 census.

Geography 
Shadow Lake is located in southwestern King County at  (47.401561, -122.069418). It is bordered to the southeast by the city of Maple Valley, to the south by the city of Covington, and to the north by the Maple Heights-Lake Desire CDP. SE Petrovitsky Road forms the northeast border of the community.

The namesake Shadow Lake water body is in the western part of the CDP.

Tahoma National Cemetery is located at (47.38722, -122.09354) in the southwest part of the CDP, off SE 240th Street.

References

Census-designated places in King County, Washington